Janet Yates is a Northern Irish archer.

She represented Northern Ireland at the 1982 Commonwealth Games where she finished with 2373 points and won a silver medal.

References

Year of birth missing (living people)
Living people
Female archers from Northern Ireland
Archers at the 1982 Commonwealth Games
Commonwealth Games silver medallists for Northern Ireland
Commonwealth Games medallists in archery
Medallists at the 1982 Commonwealth Games